Jorn Berkhout (born 18 March 2002) is a Dutch professional footballer who plays as a defender for Dutch club Jong AZ.

Club career
On 17 May 2019, Berkhout signed his first professional contract with Jong AZ. He made his professional debut with Jong AZ in a 3–3 Eerste Divisie tie with MVV on 2 October 2020.

References

External links
 

2002 births
Living people
People from Heerhugowaard
Dutch footballers
Association football defenders
Jong AZ players
Eerste Divisie players
Footballers from North Holland